Missiles is the fourth full-length studio album by Canadian indie rock band The Dears, which was released on October 20, 2008 on Dangerbird Records in the United States and MapleMusic Recordings in Canada.

Recording
The album was marked by creative tensions within the band. By the time the recording process was complete, most of the supporting musicians had left, leaving only core members Murray Lightburn and Natalia Yanchak. Lightburn subsequently selected several other musicians, including members of Pony Up, as a temporary touring band; most of the band's earlier lineup later returned for the 2011 album Degeneration Street.

Track listing

Personnel

Musicians
 George Donoso III - Drums, Background Vocals, Handclaps
 Roberto Arquila - Bass Guitar, Percussion
 Murray Lightburn - Guitar, Bass Guitar, Keyboards, Vocals, Percussion
 Patrick Krief - Guitar, Mellotron, Background Vocals, Percussion
 Robert Benvie - Guitar, Banjo, Snyth, Background Vocals, Percussion
 Adrian Popovich - Guitar
 Natalia Yanchak - Keyboards, Vocals
 Aaron Seligman - Handclaps
 Jonathon Achtman - Handclaps
 Brian Smith - Handclaps
 Jason Thomas - Handclaps, Percussion
 Matt Watkins - Trumpet
 Chris Seligman - French Horn
 Evan Cranley - Trombone
 Jade McNelis - Violin
 Marika - VLNS
 Anthony Shaw - VLNS
 Kristina Koropecki - Cello
 Rev. William Lightburn - Saxophone
 Every Kid Choir: Amethyste Baranes, Samuel Baranes, Amelia Bonter, Esme Steadman-Gantous, Simone Steadman-Gantous, Erika Vigneault, Sinna Mouilin-Creyx, Varnen Pareukan, Abby Gilbert, Maria Gabriela

Other Personnel
RECORDING:
 Daniel Lagace, Drew Malamud - Studio Plateau, MTL
 Joseph Donovan, Adrian Popovich - Mountain City, MTL
 Jace Lasek - Breakglass, MTL
MIXING:
 Roberto Arquila, Murray Lightburn, Drew Malamud - Hotel 2 Tango, MTL
MASTERING:
 Bob Ludwig - Gateway Mastering, Portland, ME
Artwork:
 Edward Maloney
A&R: Jeff Castelaz and Peter Walker
MANAGEMENT: Dangerbird
LEGALMENT: Craig Averill, Esq.

References

External links
Dangerbird Records - Album Release Information
The Dears - Missiles - on Rdio
The Dears - "Missiles" - on Spotify

2008 albums
The Dears albums
MapleMusic Recordings albums